Anhedonia is the debut album by American rock band The Graduate. The tracks "Sit & Sink" and "Justified" were featured on their previous Horror Show EP and were re-recorded for this album. The album title is a reference to Anhedonia, the psychological condition of being unable to feel joy or excitement from normally pleasurable acts, such as social or sexual interactions.

Track listing
All tracks written by The Graduate.
 "Sit & Sink" – 3:47
 "I Survived" – 2:31
 "Bet It All" – 3:03
 "Anhedonia" – 3:32
 "The City That Reads" – 4:23
 "Better Company" – 3:23
 "Surround Yourself" – 4:20
 "Interlude" – 2:24
 "Doppelgänger" – 3:25
 "Stay the Same" – 3:20
 "Justified" – 2:27
 "Sing" – 5:22

Singles
The band has released "Sit & Sink" as a single, where it has found moderate success, especially on college radio stations. To help promote the single, a music video was also released, consisting mostly of a performance by the band in a large abandoned police station.
"Anhedonia" is the second single from the album. The music video consists of the band performing in a small, dark area. Corey Warning is shown with water streaming down his face in intermittent close-ups.

Personnel
 Corey Warning – vocals
 Matt Kennedy – guitar, keyboard, vocals
 Max Sauer – guitar, vocals
 Jared Wuestenberg – bass
 Tim Moore – drums, vibraphone, keyboard, vocals
 Heather Stebbins – cello
 Brian McTernan – record producer, engineering, mixer
 George Marino – mastering
 Danny Jones – artwork

References

2007 debut albums
The Graduate (band) albums
Albums produced by Brian McTernan